Spuhler may refer to:

Hap Spuhler (1918–1982), American baseball coach
Spuhler Field, a baseball field in Fairfax, Virginia named after Hap
James Spuhler (1917–1992), American anthropologist
Johnny Spuhler (1917–2007), English professional footballer
Peter Spuhler (born 1959), Swiss entrepreneur and politician
Willy Spühler (1902–1990), Swiss politician